La Cigale (English: The Cicada) is a theatre located at 120, boulevard de Rochechouart near Place Pigalle, in the 18th arrondissement of Paris. The theatre is part of a complex connected to the Le Trabendo concert venue and the Boule Noire. The hall can accommodate 1,389 people standing or 954 seated. The orchestra floor has a scalable platform that can tilt and rise using a hydraulic system.

The Inrockuptibles music festival took place at La Cigale for over twenty years. La Cigale also hosts the Factory Festival.

History
 1887: La Cigale was built on the site of the former Boule Noire cabaret, which was demolished to make room for the new theatre. When it was first built, La Cigale had room for approximately1,000 people and featured theatrical reviews.
 1894: The theatre was enlarged and remodeled by architect Henry Grandpierre, and ceiling paintings were added by Adolphe Leon Willette. During this period, La Cigale featured performances by Mistinguett, Maurice Chevalier, Yvonne Printemps, Arletty, Raimu, and Max Linder.
 1920: The hall was given over to operettas, vaudeville, and avant-garde evenings with Jean Cocteau. A cabaret opened in the basement of La Cigale in 1924, but closed permanently three years later; it was replaced by the small temporary La Fourmi (English: The Ant) music hall.
 1940: La Cigale was converted into a movie theater specializing in B movies and Kung-fu films, and later, X-rated movies.

 1981: The theatre's vestibule and auditorium were included in the list of French historical monuments on December 8, 1981
 1987: La Cigale hosted a performance by the Les Rita Mitsouko band with the support of Jacques Renault and Fabrice Coat, two former antique dealers and cofounders of the famous Paris Les Bains Douches nightclub. The auditorium was modernized and a hydraulic system was added. The interior was redecorated by famed designer Philippe Starck. Corinne Mimram was appointed artistic and musical director.
 2007: La Cigale partnered with French telecommunications company SFR for two years, during which the name of the venue was officially changed to La Cigale SFR.
 2011: In January, Jean-Louis Menanteau became the new general director.

Performers
Entertainers who have performed at La Cigale include:

 Adele
 The Allman Brothers Band
 Angels & Airwaves
 Angerme
 Babymetal
 Banks
 Jenifer Bartoli
 Jeff Beck
 Behemoth
 Birdy Nam Nam
 Blur
 Carpenter Brut
 Jimmy Buffett
 °C-ute
 Manu Chao
 Chinese Man
 Eric Clapton
 Coldplay
 The Dandy Warhols
 David Bowie as part of Tin Machine
 Mac DeMarco
 Dido
 Diego Torres
 Dir En Grey
 Dub Incorporation
 Jango Edwards
 Elephanz
 Europe
 F.T. Island
 Franz Ferdinand
 Dave Gahan
 Ghost
 Gorillaz
 Johnny Hallyday
 Sophie Hunger
 Iggy Pop
 Norah Jones
 Stacey Kent
 Kokia
 L'impératrice
 Litfiba
 Lush
 -M-
 Marillion
 Massive Attack
 Kylie Minogue
 The Moody Blues
 Willy Moon
 Jason Mraz
 Elliott Murphy
 Muse
 Noir Désir
 Claude Nougaro
 Oasis
 Okean Elzy
 Page & Plant
 Pierre Palmade
 Panic! at the Disco
 Paramore
 Parcels
 Parkway Drive
 Placebo
 Les Plastiscines
 Daniel Powter
 Prince
 Pulp
 R5
 Radiohead
 Red Hot Chili Peppers
 Les Rita Mitsouko
 Mark Ronson
 Roxette
 The Servant
 Sigrid
 Troye Sivan
 Sleater-Kinney
 Status Quo
 The Stone Roses
 Superbus
 Supergrass
 Sunmi
 Charles Trenet
 Bonnie Tyler
 Ulver
 Vitaa
 Les Wampas
 Kim Wilde
 Johnny Winter
 The Wombats
 Les Wriggles
 Zemfira
 Julie Zenatti

Concerts and performances recorded at La Cigale

 Marc Lavoine : Live at La Cigale (concert album - 1988)
 David Bowie as part of Tin Machine : Tin Machine at La Cigale in Paris 1989
 Marillion : Made Again, disc 2 (CD - 1996)
 Les Wriggles : La Cigale (DVD - 2003)
 Lofofora : Blades background (CD + DVD - 2004)
 Johnny Hallyday : La Cigale 94 (CD - 2004)
 Les Wampas : Never trust a live! (CD + DVD - 2004)
 Thomas Fersen : La Cigale great days (CD + DVD - 2004)
 Mano Negra : General Tourconcert in 1990 included in the DVD Out of Time (2005)
 Bonnie Tyler : Bonnie on Tour (DVD 2005)
 Robert : Live at La Cigale (CD + DVD - 2005)
 Daniel Powter : Lie to Me (Daniel Powter Song) (And later the Deluxe Edition of Daniel Powter)- "Styrofoam" (Live at La Cigale)
 James Blunt : Live at La Cigalebonus DVD with the album Back to Bedlam (2006)
 Vincent Delerm : La Cigale (2CD +2 DVD - 2007)
 Johnny Hallyday : La Cigale 2007 (CD + DVD - 2007)
 Catherine Ringer : sings Rita Mitsouko and moreat La Cigale (CD + DVD - 2008)
 Grand Corps Malade : In Concert (CD + DVD - 2009)
 Booba : Autopsie Show (CD - 2010)
 Birdy Nam Nam : Live (2006)
 Stacey Kent : Dreamer In Concert (CD - 2012)
 Coldplay : Violet Hill (Song) (Mylo Xyloto Live - DVD 2012)
 Sleater-Kinney : Live in Paris (CD - 2017)
 Marillion : Brave Deluxe Edition, discs 3-4 (CD - 2018)

References

External links

 

Theatres in Paris
Buildings and structures in the 18th arrondissement of Paris
Monuments and memorials in Paris
Music venues in France